Brookefields is a shopping mall located on Brookebond Road (Krishnasamy Road) in Coimbatore, India. It was opened in May 2009. The mall has outlets from major clothing and apparel brands and a 06-screens multiplex cinema, along with a food court serving multi-cuisine dishes.

in 2016 Blackstone was set to buy Brookefields Mall.

Facilities

The Mall has a Food Court, Gaming Zone and Wi-Fi Connectivity along with basic facilities like Multistorey Parking, IOB ATM. Chennai-based SPI Cinemas operate 'The Cinema, a 06-screens Multiplex cinema on the mall's top floor.
Fun City, based within the mall itself, is a prominent attraction for children. The play area offers an arcade, a carousel, bumper cars and a 'scary house'.

Gallery

See also
Coimbatore
 List of shopping malls in India
 Prozone mall
 PVR

References

External links

Brookefields Official Website

Shopping malls in Coimbatore
2010 establishments in Tamil Nadu
Shopping malls established in 2010